Chella Ram and Chella Lakshman (also credited as Ram Laxman) are an Indian action choreographer duo who work primarily in Telugu cinema. They got six state Nandi Awards for Best Fight Master. They worked with Vikram Dharma, Kanal Kannan, Peter Hein, Stun Shiva, FEFSI Vijayan, Vijay, Anal Arasu, Stunt Silva, Dhilip Subbarayan, Ravi Varma and Anbariv.

Career
Ram and Lakshman are twin brothers who hail from Prakasam district in Andhra Pradesh.

Filmography

Stunt choreographer

Awards
Nandi Awards
 2004: Nandi Award for Best Fight Master - Arya
 2005: Nandi Award for Best Fight Master - Andhrudu
 2007: Nandi Award for Best Fight Master - Dhee
 2008: Nandi Award for Best Fight Master - Neninthe
 2009: Nandi Award for Best Fight Master - Ride
 2014: Nandi Award for Best Fight Master - Legend

References

External links

Living people
Indian action choreographers
Sibling duos
Telugu people
People from Prakasam district
Identical twin males
Year of birth missing (living people)